Dwight Morrow High School is a four-year comprehensive public high school located in Englewood, in Bergen County, New Jersey, United States, operating as part of the Englewood Public School District. The school also serves students from Englewood Cliffs, who attend as part of a sending/receiving relationship. Dwight Morrow high school shares its campus with the Academies at Englewood.

As of the 2021–22 school year, the school had an enrollment of 1,003 students and 77.1 classroom teachers (on an FTE basis), for a student–teacher ratio of 13.0:1. There were 423 students (42.2% of enrollment) eligible for free lunch and 94 (9.4% of students) eligible for reduced-cost lunch.

The Academies at Englewood is a four-year magnet high school sharing the campus that serves students in the ninth through twelfth grades from across Bergen County. The program was started by Dr. John Grieco (founder of the Bergen County Academies) serving students in the ninth to twelfth grades in Bergen County. The school was initially created in an effort to diversify the Dwight Morrow High School campus by attracting elite students outside the Englewood community to an academically-challenging, high-performing school, and the program was modeled after his Bergen County Academies. The school was additionally created to raise the standard of public education in Bergen County, and is now part of the Englewood Public Schools District (formerly part of the Bergen County Technical Schools District). Dr. John Grieco also served as the district superintendent during the school's inaugural years. Established in 2002, the Academies at Englewood include five professional and academic divisions.

History
Located on a  park-like campus and constructed at a cost of $750,000 from a design by architect Lawrence C. Licht, the school was opened to students in January 1933 with a capacity of 1,200 students, helping to ease overcrowding at the existing high school and junior high facilities.

The school is named after Dwight Morrow, a businessman, politician, and diplomat who lived in the city; Morrow was also the father-in-law of aviator Charles Lindbergh. The school shares its campus with the Academies@Englewood and Janis E. Dismus Middle School. Dwight Morrow and the Academies at Englewood are located east of Miller's Pond and share the same administration. Janis E. Dismus Middle School, formerly Englewood Middle School, is located south of Miller's Pond and operates independently.

The school had been accredited by the Middle States Association of Colleges and Schools from 1928 until 2012, when the school's accreditation status was removed.

Demographic issues
During the 1980s, changes in local demographics drastically altered the school's ethnic body resulting in an African American majority. The nearby district of Englewood Cliffs attempted to end its sending receiving relationship with Englewood due to the poor performance of the school. This led to a bitter court battle between Englewood and Englewood Cliffs beginning in 1985, a move characterized by Englewood as racist. By 1992, the school was 97% African American and Hispanic. "There were more violent incidents reported at DMHS (Dwight Morrow High School) than any other school in Bergen County in the 1991–92 school year, and test scores remained painfully low." Court battles continued, in an attempt to desegregate the high school.

According to Assemblyman John E. Rooney, "white students from Englewood Cliffs, the district trying to end its obligation to send its students to Dwight Morrow, feared for their safety at the heavily minority institution." Most Englewood Cliffs parents have chosen private school over Dwight Morrow High School.

In Fall 2002, a new magnet program was opened up in an attempt to attract non- African American students back to the school. The opening of the new academy led to more discrimination from the viewpoint of Englewood's African American community. The academy was given a portion of the campus to operate on, and the regular high school, Dwight Morrow, continued to operate on the remainder of the campus. The academy has a diverse population and is kept separate from Dwight Morrow while occupying the same campus. This has created two distinct schools on one campus. Dwight Morrow has recently had protests, overcrowded classrooms and an inferior education.

"The books are old and the classes are overcrowded,' said..., a junior. "In my history class at least five students have to stand up each day.".

The academy has highly qualified teachers as well as better resources.

"Academies@Englewood; longer school day, rigorous and engaging core academic curriculum, technology, upgraded classroom materials and equipment not available to Dwight Morrow students, climate reflecting high expectations, inviting classrooms. Students are spirited and proud of their school and opportunities."

Many residents of Englewood feel that the City of Englewood has worked against the progress of the high school by opening up the Academies. About 50% of the students are from Englewood. Englewood's African American community feels the city and the board of education has put its minority residents second with this move.

"For the past three years they've been feeling like second-class citizens in their own town, sharing a campus with another high school touted as academically superior, and getting no respect...The message to kids and parents at that 97 percent African-American and Hispanic high school is that for so-called integration to happen on the campus, you must swallow the bitter pill that tastes like apartheid."

Architecture
Dwight Morrow High School has two buildings. One building is called the North building and was the original structure of the school. In the 1960s the South building was added. The South building eventually was designated for the Academies at Englewood. The High School's North building was built using Gothic architecture. The North building features a  tower. Currently, the campus shares two buildings: the south building and the north building. The campus also shares the office of the board of education and the superintendent.

Millers Pond on the campus coupled with the Janis E. Dismus Middle School on the grounds lends a collegiate atmosphere to the school.

Athletics
The Dwight Morrow High School Maroon Raiders compete in the Big North Conference, which is comprised of public and private high schools in Bergen and Passaic counties, and was established following a reorganization of sports leagues in Northern New Jersey by the New Jersey State Interscholastic Athletic Association (NJSIAA).  The school had previously participated in the BCSL American athletic conference of the Bergen County Scholastic League. With 816 students in grades 10–12, the school was classified by the NJSIAA for the 2019–20 school year as Group III for most athletic competition purposes, which included schools with an enrollment of 761 to 1,058 students in that grade range. The football team competes in the Ivy White division of the North Jersey Super Football Conference, which includes 112 schools competing in 20 divisions, making it the nation's biggest football-only high school sports league. The football team is one of the 12 programs assigned to the two Ivy divisions starting in 2020, which are intended to allow weaker programs ineligible for playoff participation to compete primarily against each other. The school was classified by the NJSIAA as Group III North for football for 2018–2020.

The boys basketball team won the Group III state championship in 1947 (against Springfield Regional—since renamed as Jonathan Dayton High School —in the finals), 1951 (vs. Woodrow Wilson High School), 1960 (vs. Moorestown High School) and 1961 (vs. Burlington Township High School), and won the Group II title in 1975 (vs. Pleasantville High School). Led by 24 points from Sherman White, the 1947 team pulled away to defeat Springfield Regional by a score of 49–22 in the championship game at the Elizabeth Armory to win the Group III state title and run their record for the season to 25–0. The 1951 team finished the season with a record of 23-1 after winning the Group III title with a 59–34 win against Woodrow Wilson in the championship game. The 1975 team, led by future NBA player Bill Willoughby who was named to the all-tournament team, defeated defending champion Pleasantville by a score of 70–66 in the championship game to win the Group II title and finish the season with a mark of 27–2. The team won the 2008 North I, Group II state sectional title, defeating Pascack Hills High School 72–65 in the tournament final. The win marked the team's first sectional title since 2005, ending a two-year run by Pascack Hills.

The boys track team won the spring track state championship in Group III in 1965 (as co-champion) and in Group II in 1992.

The boys track team won the Group III indoor relay championships in 1970 and 1971.

Administration
Joseph Armental is the school's principal.

Notable alumni

 Bernard Belle (born 1964), Grammy Award-winning writer. 
 Regina Belle (born 1963, class of 1981), Grammy Award-winning singer., class of 1981 
 Darnell Carter (born 1987, class of 2006), Arena Football League linebacker.
 Wayne A. Cauthen (born 1955, class of 1974), City Manager of Kansas City, Missouri.
 David X. Cohen (born 1966, class of 1984), executive producer and head writer of Futurama.
 Peter Coyote (born 1941, class of 1960), actor, Grammy winner, author of Sleeping Where I Fall, history of the radical anarchist left during the 1960s in California.
 Ronald Enroth (born 1938), Professor of Sociology at Westmont College.
 Lew Erber (1934–1990), American football coach who was Offensive Coordinator for the New England Patriots and won two Super Bowls with the Oakland Raiders.
 David Feldman, comedy writer. 
 Bruce Harper (born 1955, class of 1973), former NFL Player New York Jets.
 Chris Hewitt (born 1974), former NFL  defensive back who played for the New Orleans Saints.
 Doug Howard (born 1956), musician.
 Ernie Isley (born 1952, class of 1970), lead guitarist for the Isley Brothers.
 Marvin Isley (born 1953, class of 1972), bass guitarist for the Isley Brothers. 
 Janet Jacobs (1928–2017), shortstop and center fielder who played in the All-American Girls Professional Baseball League.
 Roberta S. Jacobson (born 1960, née Steinfeld), U.S. diplomat who has served as U.S. Ambassador to Mexico since June 2016.
 Jimmie Jones (born 1947), former American football defensive end in the National Football League for the New York Jets and the Washington Redskins.
 Jon Leibowitz (born 1958, class of 1976), chairman of the Federal Trade Commission.
 Robert Levithan (born 1951, class of 1969), writer and HIV/AIDS activist
 Richard Lewis (born 1947, class of 1965), comedian and actor who has appeared as a regular on Curb Your Enthusiasm.
 Christina McHale (born 1992), professional tennis player.
 Rick Overton (born 1954, class of 1972), comedian and actor.
 Sarah Jessica Parker (born 1965), actress.
 Freddie Perren (1943–2004, class of 1961), songwriter and record producer. 
 Clarke Peters (born 1952, class of 1970), actor (Det. Lester Freamon) from the HBO series The Wire was born Peter Clark.
 Keith Reddin (born 1956, class of 1974), playwright and actor.
 Owen Renfroe (born 1968), director, General Hospital (2001–present).
 Tracey Ross (born 1959 as Linda Tracey Ross, class of 1977), actress who appeared on Ryan's Hope (1985–1987) and Passions (1999–2008).
 Richie Scheinblum (1942–2021, class of 1960), MLB All-Star outfielder.
 Wally Schirra (1923–2007, class of 1940) NASA astronaut. 
 Sister Souljah (born 1964), activist and writer. 
 Slam Stewart (1914–1987), upright bass player for Charlie Parker, Art Tatum and Slim Gillard. 
 Lou Tepe (born 1930, class of 1948), offensive lineman who played for three seasons with the Pittsburgh Steelers. 
 Tony Tolbert (born 1967), former NFL Player Dallas Cowboys. 
 David Townsend (1954–2005, class of 1972), musician who played guitar with The Isley Brothers and formed Surface with bassist David Conley in 1983.
 Joey Travolta (born 1950, class of 1969), actor.
 John Travolta (born 1954), actor.
 Austin Volk (1919–2010, class of 1937), former Mayor of Englewood and two-term member of the New Jersey General Assembly.
 Gregor Weiss (born 1941), artistic gymnast who represented the United States at the 1964 Summer Olympics, placing 7th in the team event
 Sherman White (1928–2011, class of 1947), college basketball player who was indicted in the New York City Colleges Point Shaving Scandal of 1951. 
 Bill Willoughby (born 1957, class of 1975), former NBA Player who, along with Darryl Dawkins, were the first high school players drafted by the NBA.
 John Winkin (1919–2014), baseball coach at Dwight Morrow, scout, broadcaster, journalist and collegiate athletics administrator who led the University of Maine Black Bears baseball team to six College World Series berths in an 11-year span. 
 John T. Wright, First African American Councilman elected in Bergen County, in November 1952. 
 Tom Wright (born 1952, class of 1970), actor (Weekend at Bernie's II, The Brother from Another Planet).
 Elias Zurita (born 1964), retired soccer forward who played professionally in the Major Indoor Soccer League.
 Andrew Zwicker (born 1964, class of 1982), physicist, science educator and member of the New Jersey Senate.

Popular culture
The High School's North building is featured as outside scenery for the show Sabrina, the Teenage Witch.<ref>D'Elia, Gianluca. "The 'Sabrina the Teenage Witch' house is in N.J., in Springsteen's old neighborhood", NJ Advance Media for NJ.com, May 14, 2019. Accessed January 12, 2022. "'Sabrina the Teenage Witch makes its comeback Friday in the form of a moody Netflix drama mystery just in time for Halloween.... Meanwhile, the setting for Westbridge High School, was Dwight Morrow High School in Englewood — which local viewers might recognize by its distinctive Gothic architecture and 100-foot tower."</ref>
Dwight Morrow High School was used in the filming of the Sidney Lumet film Running on Empty starring River Phoenix, Judd Hirsch and Christine Lahti.
Dwight Morrow was featured in the film Gracie''.

References

External links 

Dwight Morrow High School website
Englewood Public School District
Comprehensive social and legal history of Dwight Morrow including litigation with Englewood Cliffs and Tenafly
Solution to School's Racial Imbalance Still Elusive
Setback for Academies

Englewood, New Jersey
Englewood Cliffs, New Jersey
1933 establishments in New Jersey
Educational institutions established in 1933
Magnet schools in New Jersey
Morrow